"The Doll's House" is a 1922 short story by Katherine Mansfield. It was first published in The Nation and Atheneum on 4 February 1922 and subsequently appeared in The Doves' Nest and Other Stories (1923). Mansfield used an alternative title in other editions, including "At Karori".

Major themes

Editor's note: The items below are not themes; they are (occasionally disputable) plot summary and basic analysis. They both share the same theme: social hierarchy..

1. The school is portrayed as a melting pot or mixing of all social classes, and the Kelveys as the lowest of the social classes. The other children are discouraged from talking to them; they are outcasts. The Burnells (Kezia, Isabel and Lottie) are one of the higher-ranking families. Class distinction is also a major theme of this short story.

2. The author of “The Doll’s House” is commenting on how hard it is to raise one’s social status. The class that a person is born in is usually the class where they spend the rest of their life. It is hard to change their future because everyone else is so focused on their parents’ past. The Kelvey children can not be accepted by the other children at school and other families because of the social-state of their parents.

3. Here Mansfield portrays how parents poison their children with their perception and bring in class difference between children who should be together as friends.

4. Children don't know the world. They are still learning from their parents.

5. The lamp in the story symbolizes hope.

References

External links
Full text at lamaquinadeltiempo.com

Modernist short stories
1922 short stories
Short stories by Katherine Mansfield
Works originally published in The Nation and Atheneum